Thomas Birtwistle (16 October 1833 – 22 March 1912) was an English trade unionist and factory inspector.

Born in Great Harwood, Lancashire, he worked in a cotton mill from the age of six, becoming a power-loom weaver at the age of fourteen. In spite of limited education, he had a flair for mathematics and was skilled at working out the complicated the way cotton workers were paid. This led to involvement in the early trade union movement where he worked to enable British trade unions to gain recognition, respectability, and responsibility in the second half of the 19th century. He died in Accrington.

Union activity
He was a leading figure during the 1858 lock-out at Great Harwood.  When there were strikes at Padiham in 1859) and Colne in 1860, he was elected to the council of the new North-East Lancashire Powerloom Weavers' Association. This enable co-operation between works in different towns. In 1861 he became its full-time secretary, and held the post until 1892.

He represented the North East Association at the Trades Union Congress from 1872 and was on its parliamentary committee from 1875-1889, and was its chairman in 1881.

In 1885, he became one of the country's first working-class JPs.

In 1892, however, he was appointed by the government as a factory inspector (duties now carried out by the Health and Safety Executive), responsible for implementing parts  of the Factory Act 1891.

Personal life
He married a fellow weaver, Ellen Butterworth, who predeceased him, when he was 20. He died at his home, 17 St James's Street, Accrington, on 22 March 1912 and was buried in Accrington cemetery. He was survived by his second wife, Mary.

References

1833 births
1912 deaths
Factory inspectors
General Secretaries of the Amalgamated Weavers' Association
General Secretaries of the United Textile Factory Workers' Association
Members of the Parliamentary Committee of the Trades Union Congress
People from Great Harwood
19th-century British businesspeople